Nanda Bahadur Pun (born 23 October 1966), also known as Nanda Kishor Pun, is a Nepalese politician who was the second vice president of Nepal, in office from 2015 to 2023. He served as the chief commander of the People's Liberation Army in Nepal. He was also a member of the Central Committee of the Communist Party of Nepal (Maoist Centre).

Early life and education
Nanda Bahadur Pun was born to farmers Ramsur Pun and Mansara Pun in Rangsi - 9, Rolpa . He was the third of six children.

He started school at the age of 8 years. He completed his primary education at Jakhar Primary School and his lower secondary education at Rangsi Lower Secondary School. While he was in the seventh grade at Rangsi Lower Secondary School he was the chairman of a unit of the All Nepal National Independent Students Union (Sixth). He was a representative of his school to the 2nd district convention of the All Nepal National Independent Students Union (Sixth). He had to hide in a cave all night after the police disrupted the event.

Pun enrolled in Bal Kalyan Secondary School in Libang for his secondary education. In Libang he was influenced by his teacher, Krishna Bahadur Mahara to study about communism. In 1983 he was a representative for Rolpa at the 1st Sub Central Convention of the All Nepal National Free Students Union. Lila Mani Pokharel was elected chairman during this convention. There he was accused of being involved in a student union and was kept under arrest for a few days. After being forced to choose between his education and politics he enrolled in Thabang Secondary School in 1983. While in Thabang he was jailed for three days for his association with student unions. He passed his School Leaving Certificate exams there in 1986.

He enrolled in Mahendra Bahumukhi Campus in Dang in 1989 to pursue his higher secondary education. He completed his graduate education in Political Science. While in Dang he was the chairman of the Mashal Samuha.

Personal life
While studying in the ninth grade he married Hastamali Pun at the age of 17.

Electoral history

2013 Constituent Assembly election

References

Living people
1966 births
People from Rolpa District
Vice presidents of Nepal
Communist Party of Nepal (Maoist Centre) politicians
Nepalese military personnel
People of the Nepalese Civil War